The European Volleyball Confederation (CEV) is the governing body for Volleyball in Europe. It organises three club competitions for men: the CEV Champions League (formerly European Cup), the CEV Cup (formerly Cup Winners Cup) and the CEV Challenge Cup, There is also the CEV Super Cup (it) but this competition is no longer Exist.

Russian side CSKA Moscow have won a record total of 16 titles in CEV competitions, Three more than Modena Volley (Italy). only three teams have won every CEV club competition such as Modena Volley, Volley Treviso and Parma Volley the three from (italy) .

Italian clubs have won the most titles (76), ahead of clubs from the Soviet Union (26) and Russia (18). 
Italy is the only country in European volleyball history whose clubs won the three main competitions in the same season in huge ten occasions : 1983—84, 1991—92, 1992—93, 1993—94, 1994—95, 1996—97, 1997—98, 2005—06, 2009—10, 2010—11.

Winners

By club
CSKA Moscow is the most crowned one in CEV Champions League with 13 titles record, in CEV Cup Dynamo Moscow have won 4 titles and in the CEV Challenge Cup Modena Volley  stand alone with 5 titles record. 
The following table lists all the men's clubs that have won at least one CEV club competition, and is updated as of 22 May 2022 (in chronological order).

Key

By country
The following table lists all the countries whose clubs have won at least one CEV competition, and is updated as of 22 May 2022 (in chronological order).

See also
European Volleyball Confederation
Clubs with the most international titles in volleyball

References

External links
 CEV Official Website 
 

 

Volleyball-related lists